Nestos, Mesta,  or formerly the Mesta Karasu in Turkish (Karasu meaning "black river"), is a river in Bulgaria and Greece. It rises in the Rila Mountains and flows into the Aegean Sea near the island of Thasos. It plunges down towering canyons toward the Aegean Sea through mostly metamorphic formations. At the end, the main stream spreads over the coastal plain of Chrysoupolis and expands as a deltaic system with freshwater lakes and ponds forming the Nestos delta. It forms some gorges in Rila and Pirin. The longest gorge between Pirin to the west and the Rhodope Mountains to the east is the 25-km long Momina Klisura in Bulgaria.

The Mesta's longest tributary is the Dospat (or Despatis). The banks of the river are covered mainly by deciduous trees that extend into halfway between Bulgaria and Greece where it forms the modern boundary of Greek Macedonia and Thrace, as well as the boundary between the Kavala and the Xanthi regional units, having first crossed the Drama regional unit. The river later forms a delta to the north where swamplands, wetlands and a lagoon once existed except in the east.

History
In the Geography of Claudius Ptolemy, the river is referred to as Nestus (Νέστος), and is said to form the boundary between ancient Macedonia and Thrace.

Because of its flow between canyons and inaccessible mountain areas, Nestos was not navigable in antiquity and also did not offer a natural terrestrial road along the riverbed. Concerning the horizontal communication from the East to the West, the river had only two passes, one in the middle and the other in the lower watercourse, which were controlled respectively by the cities of Nicopolis and Topeiros. The first pass, near Nicopolis, allowed the communication between the valleys of the rivers Strymon and Hebros (Evros), while through the second pass, near Topeiros, passed an ancient road (and later the Roman road of Via Egnatia) that served the communication between the East and the West. In Nestos' valley (east bank) north of the south pass, the Dii used to live, while Satrae were living to the south. Finally, Nestos played an important role in the urban and economic history of the inhabitants of the estuary, where the city of Abdera and later Topeiros, founded by the Emperor Trajan. This is presumed by the deification of the river and its depiction on coins of the imperial period.

Honour
Mesta Peak on Livingston Island in the South Shetland Islands, Antarctica is named after Mesta River.

Gallery

References

Rivers of Bulgaria
Rivers of Greece
 
Geography of Thrace
International rivers of Europe
Landforms of Blagoevgrad Province
Landforms of Smolyan Province
Landforms of Pazardzhik Province
Rivers of Eastern Macedonia and Thrace
Landforms of Kavala (regional unit)
Landforms of Xanthi (regional unit)
Landforms of Drama (regional unit)